Meskhiev is a Russian masculine surname, its feminine counterpart is Meskhieva. It may refer to
Dmitry Meskhiev (born 1963), Russian film director
Shalva Aleksi-Meskhishvili (Shalva Meskhiev; 1884–1960), Georgian jurist and politician 

Russian-language surnames